The 2009 GP Ouest-France was a one-day road race which took place on 23 August 2009 in Plouay, France. The race was won by the Australian Simon Gerrans, his first victory in a major one-day race. Frenchman Pierrick Fédrigo came in second, with Paul Martens of Germany coming in third. Gerrans won a sprint from a five-man breakaway group which also included Anthony Roux of France and Dan Martin of Ireland.

Results

External links 
 2009 GP Ouest-France

2009
2009 UCI World Ranking
2009 in French sport
GP Ouest-France